The Waubra wind farm is located on both sides of the Sunraysia Highway 35 km north-west of Ballarat in Victoria, Australia. Upon its completion in July 2009, it was the largest wind farm in Australia and was the largest wind farm by number of turbines and total capacity in the southern hemisphere.

Consisting of 128 wind turbines, with associated substations and an operations centre, each wind turbine has a capacity of 1.5 megawatts (MW). The total installed capacity is 192 MW. The turbines have a tip height of 119 metres, rotor diameter of 77 metres and a hub height of 80 metres. Annually the farm is projected to generate 630 GWh of energy over the life of the project, for an annual capacity factor of 37.5%.

The green energy generated by the wind farm each year provides electricity for 138,000 households enough to power a city 3-4 times the size of Ballarat.

Acciona Energy formed a Community Reference Group (CRG) for the construction phase of the Waubra wind farm, to provide a regular forum for community input to the project and to facilitate communication between members of the Waubra community and the wind farm project team. In 2010 the anti-wind farm lobby group the Waubra Foundation adopted the name of the nearby town.

The construction of the Waubra wind farm received financial assistance as part of the Victorian State government's Victorian Renewable Energy Target (VRET).

In July 2011 the Australian Broadcasting Corporation 4 Corners program explored health concerns connected with Australian wind farms in its Against the Wind report. The Waubra wind farm and the community living around it was featured in the report.

A viewing platform designed by Melbourne-based firm JOH Architects is accessible to tourists and located just off the Sunraysia Highway.

Operations 
The generation table uses eljmkt nemlog to obtain generation values for each month.

Note: Records date back to 2011.

See also

List of wind farms in Victoria
Wind power
Wind power in Australia

References

External links

Wind farms in Victoria
JOH Architects

Wind farms in Victoria (Australia)